San Patricio is Spanish for "Saint Patrick". As a name it may have several meanings:

Places 
 San Patricio del Chañar, town in Argentina 
 San Patricio, Jalisco, community in Jalisco state, Mexico
 San Patricio, New Mexico, community in Lincoln County, U.S.
 San Patricio, Paraguay
 San Patricio, Ponce, Puerto Rico, barrio
San Patricio River (Río de San Patricio), Puerto Rico
 San Patricio, Texas, U.S. city
 San Patricio County, Texas, on the Gulf Coast, U.S.
 Avenida San Patricio (San Patricio Avenue), street and neighborhood in Guaynabo, Puerto Rico
 San Patricio Plaza, shopping mall in Guaynabo, Puerto Rico

Others
 Battle of San Patricio in the Texas Revolution
 Saint Patrick's Battalion (Batallón de San Patricio), mostly-Irish (-American) expatriate unit in the Mexican-American War
 San Patricio (album), a 2010 album by the Chieftains
 , Chilean (and Liberian) cargo ship, mid-20th century
 San Patricio Church massacre, in Argentina

See also
Saint Patrick (disambiguation)